The 1991–92 season was the 46th season in FK Partizan's existence. This article shows player statistics and matches that the club played during the 1991–92 season.

Players

Squad information

Competitions

Yugoslav First League

Yugoslav Cup

1  Return leg was scheduled to be played on 6 May 1992, but due to Bosnian War and Željezničar club leaving the competition, it was not, hence Partizan were awarded the 3-0 win.

UEFA Cup

First round

See also
 List of FK Partizan seasons

Notes and references

External links
 Official website
 Partizanopedia 1991-92  (in Serbian)

FK Partizan seasons
Partizan